"Live Life" is a track from The Kinks' 1978 album, Misfits. The track was written by The Kinks' primary songwriter, Ray Davies.

About

The lyrics of the song, in a similar theme to many other tracks written by Ray Davies, say that, no matter what's happening in the world, you must pick yourself up (since no one else is going to help you). The track also makes references to "the fascists and the left wing militants", "crooked politicians and the unemployment queues", and the Irish Republican Army, who, at the time, used illegal methods to attempt breaking away from Britain.

The track also features Ron Lawrence playing bass guitar instead of Andy Pyle or John Dalton (the bassists that were members of the band at one point of the album's recording). Session drummer Clem Cattini performs drums.

Dave Davies's opinion
Dave Davies has since praised the song on his Facebook account saying, "I love it - its one of my favorite tracks." He also praised Cattini's drums, saying, "Clem Cattini did a great job playing drums on this."

Release

"Live Life" had multiple appearances on The Kinks' records. It first appeared on Misfits, where it was the third track (except in Britain, where a longer version of the track was instead seventh in the running order). On the Remastered CD version of the album, however, the U.K. version of the album became the listing that was used, with the non-U.K. version of "Live Life" being added as a bonus track. To add, "Live Life" replaced "Artificial Light" as the B-side of the "A Rock 'N' Roll Fantasy" single in America. Then, on 14 July 1978, it was released as the second single from Misfits, backed with "In a Foreign Land" in Britain and "Black Messiah" in America. It didn't chart.

References

1978 songs
The Kinks songs
Songs written by Ray Davies
Arista Records singles